The Journal for the Study of the New Testament is a peer-reviewed academic journal that publishes papers five times a year in the field of Biblical studies. It is founded by Bruce Chilton. The current journal's editor is Louise Lawrence (University of Exeter) and the previous one was Catrin Williams (University of Wales). It has been in publication since 1978 and is currently published by SAGE Publications.

Scope 
The Journal for the Study of the New Testament publishes papers on work from historical perspectives, studies using social-scientific and literary theory or developing theological, cultural, and contextual approaches. The journal aims to present a resource for scholars, teachers in the field of New Testament, postgraduate students and advanced undergraduates.

Abstracting and indexing 
The Journal for the Study of the New Testament is abstracted and indexed in the following databases:
 Academic Complete
 Academic Premier
 SCOPUS
 ZETOC

External links 
 

SAGE Publishing academic journals
English-language journals
Sociology journals
Biblical studies journals
Publications established in 1978
5 times per year journals